Sallaans (Low Saxon: Sallaands) is a collective term for the Westphalian dialects of the region Salland, in the province of Overijssel, as well as in minor parts of Gelderland and Drenthe in the Eastern Netherlands. In the Kop van Overijssel, the Stellingwarfs dialect is spoken.

A common term used by native speakers for their dialect, which is also used by Low Saxon speakers from other regions for their respective dialects, is plat or simply dialect. Yet another common usage is to refer to the language by the name of the local variety, where for instance Dal(f)sens would be the name for the Sallaans variety spoken in the village of Dalfsen. Sallands is more influenced by the Hollandic dialects than Twents or Achterhoeks. This influence is known as the Hollandse expansie. For example, the word 'house' (Standard Dutch huis ) is hoes  in Twents but huus  in Sallaans.

Phonology

Consonants

  appears only as an allophone of  before voiced consonants.
 // occurring before and after back-rounded vowels is pronounced as a labio-velar approximant [].
 After long close and close-mid vowels,  surfaces as a diphthongization of the vowel, as in zoer . This also happens in compounds: veurkämer . It is also often dropped preconsonantally after .

Vowels

 Unlike in Standard Dutch, the long close-mid monophthongs  are actual monophthongs and not narrow closing diphthongs . They do not appear before  whenever that consonant occurs before a vowel or at the end of a word, where the open-mid series  occurs instead.

  is realized as  before vowels and in the word-final position.

Some examples

Present tense

Past tense

Plurals and diminutives

References

Bibliography

Further reading

External links
 The Parable of the Prodigal Son in the Zwolle variety of Sallaans
 The same, from Deventer

Westphalian dialects
Dutch Low Saxon
Languages of the Netherlands
Culture of Drenthe
Culture of Overijssel
Salland
Emmen, Netherlands